Jersey Baptist Church Cemetery is a historic church cemetery located on SR 1272 in Linwood, Davidson County, North Carolina.   The church was founded in 1755, and the current Jersey Settlement Meeting House was built nearby in 1842. The cemetery contains approximately 50 burials, with the earliest gravestone dated to 1772.  It features a unique collection of folk gravestones by local stonecutters erected in Davidson County in the late-18th and first half of the 19th centuries.

The cemetery was added to the National Register of Historic Places in 1984.

References

External links
Official Church Website

Baptist cemeteries in the United States
Cemeteries on the National Register of Historic Places in North Carolina
1755 establishments in the Thirteen Colonies
Cemeteries in Davidson County, North Carolina
National Register of Historic Places in Davidson County, North Carolina